Villar de Domingo García is a municipality located in the province of Cuenca, Castile-La Mancha, Spain.

According to the 2004 census (INE), the municipality had a population of 271 inhabitants.

Roman villa
In the municipality are the remains of an important Roman villa known in Spanish as the Villa romana de Noheda. It is notable for its mosaics. In June 2019 it was hoped to open the site to the public in the near future.

References

Municipalities in the Province of Cuenca